Joseph Chabran (21 June 1763 in Cavaillon – February 1843 in Avignon), was a French military officer. He served as infantry commander during the French Revolutionary Wars and the Peninsular War. 

Chebran traveled over the Pacific Ocean through the Spanish routes in the Mariana Islands and the Philippines before settling back in France.

Offspring 
It was rumored that he had concubines and fathered children on his way back to France. The only documented child he claimed at the time was named Elena Chabran. Elena was one of his favorite children as she looked the most like the Commander.  Elena was a teenager when she boarded the ship with Commander Chabran but fell in love and married a shipmate who died in the Marianas. Elena eventually married Don Juan Deleon Guerrero and stayed on the island of Saipan while her father and other siblings returned to France. Many of his children and their mothers never made it to France and were rumored to have disembarked at other ports.

References 

French military personnel of the French Revolutionary Wars
French military personnel of the Napoleonic Wars
Knights of the Order of Saint Louis
Commandeurs of the Légion d'honneur
1763 births
1843 deaths
Date of death unknown
Names inscribed under the Arc de Triomphe